Erik Jonvik (born 29 December 1990) is a Norwegian footballer who is playing as a midfielder for KFUM Oslo.

He had a stint for Sarpsborg 08, joining them after the 2010 season. The team then made its debut on the first tier, with Jonvik appearing 21 times. They were relegated, and after one season with Sarpsborg 08 in the Norwegian First Division he returned to KFUM in 2013.

Jonvik has also appeared for the national futsal team, scoring a goal in their first official match, a 2–1 win against Ireland.

References

1990 births
Living people
Footballers from Oslo
Norwegian footballers
Sarpsborg 08 FF players
Eliteserien players
Norwegian First Division players
KFUM-Kameratene Oslo players
Norwegian men's futsal players
Association football midfielders